The Czech Open is a darts tournament held now at Orea Pyramida Hotel in Prague, Czech Republic and in the past also in many other arenas in the Czech Republic. First edition of this tournament took place in 1995. In 2018-2019, it was one of the most important British Darts Organisation (BDO) and World Darts Federation (WDF) tournament.

The first winners of this tournament was Jaroslav Procházka from Czech Republic and Liza Manongson from Austria.

List of tournaments

Men's

Women's

Youth's

Records and statistics

Nine-dart finishes

References

External links
 Czech Open website
 Czech Darts Organization website

Darts tournaments
Darts in the Czech Republic
Recurring sporting events established in 1995
1995 establishments in the Czech Republic